Chathedom is a village in Ernakulam district in Kerala, India.

References

Villages in Ernakulam district